Charlie Harper may refer to:

 Charlie Harper (Two and a Half Men), a fictional character in the CBS sitcom Two and a Half Men
 Charlie Harper (singer) (born 1944), member of the punk rock band U.K. Subs
 Charlie Harper (American football) (born 1944), American football player

See also
 Charley Harper (1922–2007), American Modernist artist
Charles Harper (disambiguation)